UFC 85: Bedlam was a mixed martial arts event held by the Ultimate Fighting Championship (UFC) on June 7, 2008, at The O2 Arena in London, United Kingdom.

Background
The card was plagued by a number of injuries sustained by scheduled fighters, forcing the UFC to rework the card several times. Originally, the main event was to be between light heavyweights Chuck Liddell and Mauricio Rua; however, Rua required surgery on an injured knee and could not compete. Rashad Evans then replaced Rua in the main event with Liddell, but Liddell was forced to withdraw from the card due to a hamstring injury. The UFC then named James Irvin as Liddell's replacement to fight Evans, but Irvin sustained a foot injury that forced him to pull out. Evans was then removed from the card as well.

The main event was ultimately changed to Matt Hughes against Thiago Alves. Hughes took the fight on short notice as a favor to the UFC and Alves came in four pounds overweight.

In other changes, a Jonathan Goulet and Paul Kelly match was cancelled when Goulet dropped out citing a lack of training time, followed by Kelly withdrawing before his opponent could be named because of an injury sustained in practice.

Due to legal problems which resulted in a lack of time to prepare for his fight with Michael Bisping, Chris Leben was forced to withdraw from the card and the UFC announced Jason Day would face Bisping.

Ryo Chonan was replaced by Kevin Burns, and Neil Wain was replaced by Eddie Sanchez.

Results

Bonus awards
At the end of this event, the UFC awarded $50,000 to each of the fighters who received one of these three awards.

Fight of the Night: Matt Wiman vs. Thiago Tavares
Knockout of the Night: Thiago Alves
Submission of the Night: Kevin Burns

See also
 Ultimate Fighting Championship
 List of UFC champions
 List of UFC events
 2008 in UFC

References

External links
UFC 85 Event Site
Official UFC 85 Fight Card

Ultimate Fighting Championship events
2008 in mixed martial arts
Mixed martial arts in the United Kingdom
Sport in the Royal Borough of Greenwich
2008 sports events in London
June 2008 sports events in the United Kingdom